Lake Carl Etling, elevation , also called Lake Carl G. Etling and Carl Etling Lake, is located southeast of Kenton, Oklahoma in Cimarron County, Oklahoma, inside Black Mesa State Park.  Fed by South Carrizo Creek, it is 159 surface acres in size and has 5 miles of shoreline.  It has an average depth of 11 feet, with a maximum depth of 38 feet.

Operated by the Oklahoma Wildlife Department, it is stocked with largemouth bass, flathead catfish, walleye, and smallmouth bass. Boat ramps are located on the east and south sides of the lake, but water sport activities are not allowed.  Camping facilities are available within the Park.

References

Lakes of Oklahoma